All Our Yesterdays is the tenth studio album by the group Blackmore's Night, released on September 18, 2015.

Track listing

Credits 
 Ritchie Blackmore - acoustic and electric guitars, hurdy-gurdy, nyckelharpa, mandola
 Candice Night - lead and harmony vocals, woodwinds, tambourine
 Earl Grey of Chimay (Mike Clemente) - bass & rhythm guitar
 Scarlet Fiddler - violin
 Bard David of Larchmont (David Baranowski) - keyboards, backing vocals
 Troubador of Aberdeen (David Keith) - percussion
 Lady Lynn (Christina Lynn Skleros) - harmony vocals
 Executive producer / director - Ritchie Blackmore
 Assistant producer / sound engineer / orchestral arrangements - Pat Regan

Chart performance

References

Blackmore's Night albums
2015 albums